Butorphanol is a morphinan-type synthetic agonist–antagonist opioid analgesic developed by Bristol-Myers. Butorphanol is most closely structurally related to levorphanol. Butorphanol is available as the tartrate salt in injectable, tablet, and intranasal spray formulations. The tablet form is only used in dogs, cats and horses due to low bioavailability in humans.

It was patented in 1971 and approved for medical use in 1979.

Medical uses
The most common indication for butorphanol is management of migraine using the intranasal spray formulation. It may also be used parenterally for management of moderate-to-severe pain, as a supplement for balanced general anesthesia, and management of pain during labor.  Butorphanol is also quite effective at reducing post-operative shivering (owing to its Kappa agonist activity). Butorphanol is more effective in reducing pain in women than in men.

Pharmacology
Butorphanol exhibits partial agonist and antagonist activity at the μ-opioid receptor, as well as partial agonist activity at the κ-opioid receptor (Ki = 2.5 nM; EC50 = 57 nM; Emax = 57%). Stimulation of these receptors on central nervous system neurons causes an intracellular inhibition of adenylate cyclase, closing of influx membrane calcium channels, and opening of membrane potassium channels. This leads to hyperpolarization of the cell membrane potential and suppression of action potential transmission of ascending pain pathways.
Because of its κ-agonist activity, at analgesic doses butorphanol increases pulmonary arterial pressure and cardiac work. Additionally, κ-agonism can cause dysphoria at therapeutic or supratherapeutic doses; this gives butorphanol a lower potential for abuse than other opioid drugs.

Side effects
As with other opioid analgesics, central nervous system effects (such as sedation, confusion, and dizziness) are considerations with butorphanol. Nausea and vomiting are common. Less common are the gastrointestinal effects of other opioids (mostly constipation).  Another side effect experienced by people taking the medication is increased perspiration.

Name
Within the INN, USAN, BAN, and AAN naming systems this drug is known as butorphanol, while within JAN it is named torbugesic. As the tartrate salt, butorphanol is known as butorphanol tartrate (USAN, BAN).

Its tradename Stadol was recently discontinued by the manufacturer. It is now only available in its generic formulations manufactured by Apotex, Mylan, Novex and Ben Venue Laboratories.

Availability
Butorphanol is available in the U.S. as a generic drug; it is available in various nations under one of any number of trade names, including Moradol and Beforal (Brand name Stadol no longer available in the US); veterinary trade names include Butorphic, Dolorex, Morphasol, Torbugesic, and Torbutrol.

Legality
Butorphanol is listed under the Single Convention on Narcotic Drugs 1961 and in the United States is a Schedule IV Narcotic controlled substance with a DEA ACSCN of 9720; being in Schedule IV it is not subject to annual aggregate manufacturing quotas. The free base conversion ratio of the hydrochloride is 0.69. Butorphanol was originally in Schedule II and at one point it was decontrolled.

Veterinary use
In veterinary anesthesia, butorphanol (trade name: Torbugesic) is widely used as a sedative and analgesic in dogs, cats and horses. For sedation, it may be combined with tranquilizers such as alpha-2 agonists (medetomidine), benzodiazepines, or acepromazine in dogs, cats and exotic animals. It is frequently combined with xylazine or detomidine in horses.

Butorphanol is used for sedation and mild to moderate pain control in dogs and cats. It is not considered adequate pain control in dogs undergoing surgical pain. It is used for operative and accident-related pain in small mammals such as dogs, cats, ferrets, coatis, raccoons, mongooses, various marsupials, some rodents and perhaps some larger birds. 

Although butorphanol is commonly used for pain relief in reptiles, no studies (as of 2014) have conclusively shown that it is an effective analgesic in reptiles.

Use in horses

Butorphanol is a commonly used narcotic for pain relief in horses. It is administered either IM or IV, with its analgesic properties beginning to take effect about 15 minutes after injection and lasting 4 hours. It is also commonly paired with sedatives, such as xylazine and detomidine, to make the horse easier to handle during veterinary procedures.

Side effects specific to horses include sedation, CNS excitement (displayed by head pressing or tossing). Overdosing may result in seizures, falling, salivation, constipation, and muscle twitching. If an overdose occurs, a narcotic antagonist, such as naloxone, may be given. Caution should be used if butorphanol is administered in addition to other narcotics, sedatives, depressants, or antihistamines as it will cause an additive effect.

Butorphanol can cross the placenta, and it will be present in the milk of lactating mares who are given the drug.

The drug is also prohibited for use in competition by most equestrian organizations, including the FEI, which considers it a class A drug.

See also 
 Levallorphan
 Nalbuphine
 Nalfurafine
 Nalorphine
 Xorphanol

Notes

References 

 
 
 
 

Tertiary alcohols
Analgesics
Equine medications
Kappa-opioid receptor agonists
Morphinans
Phenols
Synthetic opioids
Cyclobutyl compounds
Cat medications
Dog medications